KBUR (1490 AM) is a radio station licensed to serve the community of Burlington, Iowa.  The station primarily broadcasts a talk radio format.  KBUR is owned by Pritchard Broadcasting Corporation. It was first licensed on September 11, 1941.

Pritchard Broadcasting Corporation (owned by John T. Pritchard) agreed to purchase the station from GAP West (owned by Skip Weller) in late 2007.  The station was owned by Clear Channel prior to GAP West.

References

External links
KBUR website

FCC History Cards for KBUR

BUR
Talk radio stations in the United States
Burlington, Iowa
Radio stations established in 2007